Constant Rémy (20 May 1882 – 16 August 1958) was a French film actor. He appeared in more than sixty films during his career.

Selected filmography
 Atlantis (1930)
 A Star Disappears (1932)
 The Nude Woman (1932)
 Roger la Honte (1933)
 The Agony of the Eagles (1933)
 The Red Robe (1933)
 Street Without a Name (1934)
 Little Jacques (1934)
 The Mysteries of Paris (1935)
 Helene (1936)
 The Men Without Names (1937)
 Royal Affairs in Versailles (1954)

References

Bibliography
 Mosley, Philip. Split Screen: Belgian Cinema and Cultural Identity. SUNY Press, 2001.

External links

1892 births
1958 deaths
Male actors from Paris
French male film actors
French male silent film actors
20th-century French male actors